This article is an overview of the past products of Daewoo Motor and GM Daewoo.

Former GM Daewoo range 
 Matiz Classic M200
 Matiz Creative M300
 Gentra/Gentra X T200/T250
 Lacetti Premiere J300
 Tosca Premium6 V250
 Alpheon VS300
 Veritas
 Winstorm C100
 Winstorm MaXX C100
 Damas and Labo minivan and mini pick-up

Exhaustive list of Daewoo Motor and GM Daewoo passenger cars

Daewoo-based models
 Espero - Aranos (1990–1997) 

 Kalos - Gentra/Gentra X T200-T250 (2002–present)
Also marketed as the Chevrolet Aveo/Kalos/Lova, Holden Barina, Pontiac Wave/G3, and the Suzuki Swift+
 Lacetti J200 (2003–2009)
Also marketed as the Suzuki Forenza, Chevrolet Optra/Lacetti, Holden Viva and Buick Excelle/Excelle HRV
 Lacetti Premiere J300 (2008–present)
Also marketed as Holden Cruze, is the South Korean version of Chevrolet Cruze
 Lanos T100 (1996–present)
Also marketed as the Doninvest Assol, ZAZ Lanos/Sens/Chance, FSO Lanos and Chevrolet Lanos

 Leganza V100 (1997–2002)
Also marketed as the Doninvest Kondor
 Magnus - Evanda V200 (2000–2006)
Also marketed as the Chevrolet Epica/Evanda, Suzuki Verona, Formosa Magnus
 Matiz M100-M150-M200 (1998–present)
Also marketed as the Chevrolet Matiz/Spark/Joy/Exclusive, Formosa Matiz, FSO Matiz and Pontiac Matiz G2
 Matiz Creative M300 (2009–present)
Also marketed as the 2010 Chevrolet Spark

 Nubira J100 (1997–2003)
Also marketed as the Doninvest Orion
 Tacuma - Rezzo U100 (2000–2008)
Also marketed as the Chevrolet Tacuma/Rezzo/Vivant
 Tosca V250 (2006–2011) 
Also marketed as the Chevrolet Epica or Holden Epica
 Winstorm C100 (2006–present)
Also marketed as the Chevrolet Captiva and Holden Captiva
 Winstorm MaXX C100 (2008–present) 
Also marketed as the Opel/Vauxhall Antara, Holden Captiva MaXX/Captiva 5, Saturn Vue 2nd generation and UAE GMC Terrain

Holden-based models

 Veritas (2008–2011) 
Rebadged WM Caprice
 Statesman (2005–2006)
Rebadged WL Statesman

Honda-based models
 Arcadia (1994–2000) 
Rebadged Honda Legend 2nd gen.

Opel-based models
 Cielo - Nexia (1994–1997)
Based on the Opel Kadett E
 LeMans (1986–1994) 
Based on the Opel Kadett E - Variants : Racer (3-door hatchback) and Penta-5 (5-door hatchback) 
Other names : 1.5i (Australia), Fantasy (Thailand), Pointer, Daewoo Heaven
Exported as : Asüna GT (Canada 1991–1993 hatchback), Asüna SE (Canada 1991–1993 sedan), Passport Optima (Canada 1989–1991) and Pontiac LeMans (North America & New Zealand)
 Maepsy-Na (1982–1986)
Based on the Opel Kadett C
 Prince (1991–1997)
Based on the Opel Rekord E, more luxurious variants : Super Salon later renamed Brougham (1991–1999)
 Royale Series
First generation (1975–1978) based on Opel Rekord D
Second generation (1980–1991) based on Opel Rekord E, variants : Automatic, Diesel, Duke, Prince, Salon, Salon Super and XQ

Nissan-based models
 Daewoo Vanette (1986-1992)
Rebadged Nissan Vanette

Saturn-based models
 G2X (2007–2009)
Rebadged Saturn Sky Red Line

SsangYong Motor-based models
 Chairman
Rebadged SsangYong Chairman
 Istana
Rebadged SsangYong Istana
 Korando (1999–2001)
Rebadged SsangYong Korando
 Musso 
Rebadged SsangYong Musso
 Rexton

Rebadged Ssangyong Rexton

Suzuki-based models
 Damas - Damas II/Attivo and pick-up version Labo (1991–present)
Rebadged Suzuki Carry - Also marketed as the Chevrolet CMV/CMP in South America
 Tico/Fino (1991–2001)
Rebadged Suzuki Alto

Commercial vehicles 
''Daewoo's commercial vehicle business was acquired by Tata Motors in 2004. The business is now known as Tata Daewoo Commercial Vehicle. Daewoo Bus is not owned by Tata.
 Daewoo BM090 
 Daewoo BS090
 Daewoo BF101/105
 Daewoo BS105/106
 Daewoo BV101
 Daewoo BV113
 Daewoo BH113
 Daewoo BH115
 Daewoo BH115E
 Daewoo BH116
 Daewoo BH117
 Daewoo BH120(H)
 Daewoo Chasedae Truck
 Elf (Rebadged Isuzu Elf)
 Daewoo Lublin

Concept cars 
 Daewoo Imago (1993)
 Daewoo DACC-1 (1993) - all 1993 concepts shown in the Taejŏn Expo '93 (Korea)
 Daewoo DEV-2 (1994) - electric vehicle based on the Daewoo Espero
 Daewoo DEV-4 (1994) - electric vehicle based on the Daewoo Cielo 
 Daewoo DACC-2 (1994)
 Daewoo No.1 (1995)
 Daewoo No.2 (1995)
 Daewoo Bucrane (1995) - Designed by Giorgetto Giugiaro on the Daewoo Arcadia basis
 Daewoo Mya (1996, 1998)
 Daewoo Tacuma (1997)
 Daewoo Joyster (1997)
 Daewoo Cabriolet (1997) - Lanos cabrio
 Daewoo Matiz (1997)
 Daewoo DEV-5 (1997)
 Daewoo Mantica (1997)
 Daewoo Lanos EV / Nubira HEV / Leganza NGV (1997)
 Daewoo Shiraz (1997) - all 1997 concepts shown in the 1997 Seoul Motor Show
 Daewoo d'Arts City, Sport, Style (1997)
 Daewoo Mirae (1999)
 Daewoo DMS-1 (1999)
 Daewoo DEV 5-5 (1999)
 Daewoo Matiz Decorate (1999)
 Daewoo Tacuma Sport (1999)
 Daewoo Tacuma Style (1999) - presented at the 1999 Tokyo Motor Show
 Daewoo Matiz Canvas Top (1999) - presented at the 1999 Tokyo Motor Show
 Daewoo Korando Camping Car (1999) - presented at the 1999 Tokyo Motor Show
 Daewoo Musiro (2000)
 Daewoo Matiz Track (2000)
 Daewoo Vada (2001)
 GM Daewoo Flex/Universe (2001)
 Daewoo V-222 (2001)
 GM Daewoo Oto/Scope (2003)
 GM Daewoo Speedster (2003)
 GM Daewoo M3X (2004) - third generation of Matiz since 2005
 GM Daewoo S3X (2004) - GM Daewoo Winstorm since 2006
 GM Daewoo T2X (2005)
 Chevrolet WTTC Ultra (2006) - designed by the GM DAT Design Center
 GM Daewoo G2X (2006) - sold in South Korea since the end of 2007
 Chevrolet Trax (2007) - designed by the GM DAT Design Center
 Chevrolet Beat (2007) - designed by the GM DAT Design Center
 Chevrolet Groove (2007) - designed by the GM DAT Design Center
 GM Daewoo L4X - Sold as GM Daewoo Veritas
 Chevrolet Orlando (2009) - designed by the GM DAT Design Center
 Chevrolet Aveo RS Concept (2010) - designed by the GM DAT Design Center, presented at the 2010 Detroit Motor Show

See also 
 GM Korea
 Daewoo Bus (not affiliated with GM Korea)
 Daewoo Motor Sales
 Tata Daewoo Commercial Vehicle (not affiliated with GM Korea)
 UzDaewooAuto (not affiliated with GM Korea)

Daewoo